= National Association of Nigerian Traders =

Trade organization in Nigeria

- Abbreviation: NANTS
- Formation: 1997
- Headquarters: Abuja, Nigeria
- Region served: Nigeria, West Africa
- National President: Ken Ukaoha
- Website: nants.org

The National Association of Nigerian Traders (NANTS) is a trade organization in Nigeria that represents traders, market associations, and small business owners. It engages in advocacy for fair trade practices, economic policies, and the rights of traders within Nigeria.

== History and overview ==
NANTS was established in 1997 to unite Nigerian traders and strengthen their collective voice in trade-related matters. Headquartered in Abuja, the association includes members from sectors such as food, textiles, electronics, and general merchandise.

NANTS has implemented programs to support smallholder farmers. It has also collaborated with the Market Traders Association of Nigeria (MATAN) to simplify tax collection processes.

The association is led by a National President, supported by a National Executive Council (NEC) and state coordinators across Nigeria's 36 states. The current president is Ken Ukaoha. NANTS collaborates with various local and international organizations, including: ECOWAS, Market Traders Association of Nigeria (MATAN), World Trade Organization (WTO).
